is a Japanese rugby union player who plays as a hooker. He currently plays for Toshiba Brave Lupus Tokyo in Japan's domestic Japan Rugby League One. He was signed to the Sunwolves squad for the 2020 Super Rugby season, but did not make an appearance for the side.

References

1999 births
Living people
Japanese rugby union players
Rugby union hookers
Sunwolves players
Toshiba Brave Lupus Tokyo players